Many different terms have been proposed for features of the tooth crown in mammals.

The structures within the molars receive different names according to their position and morphology. This nomenclature was developed by Henry Fairfield Osborn in 1907 and is, although with many variations, the one that continues today. 

 The suffix "-cones /-conids" (upper molar/lower molar) is added to the main cusps: Paraconus, Metaconus, Protoconus and Hypoconus on the upper molar, and Paraconid, Metaconid, Protoconid, Hypoconid and Entoconid on the lower molar. This name is used for both bunodont and selenodont molars, that is, as many for "buno" pillar-like cusps as for "selenes" crescent-like cusps.
 The suffix "-conule /-conulid" (upper molar/lower molar) is added to the secondary cusps. For example, Metaconule, Hypoconulid.
 The suffix "-style/-stylid" (upper molar/lower molar) is added to the peripheral cusps that are found in the cornices or cingulus of the tooth. These cusps are traditionally named according to their proximity to the main cusps, although some anatomists prefer to name them according to their position on the tooth.
 The suffix "-loph/-lophid" (upper molar/lower molar) is added to the crests that join cusps together. They include in the name one the cusps involved. For example, the hypolophid is the ridge that unites the hypoconid with the entoconid. These ridges often have secondary ridges: the secondary crest of the ectoloph is called crista; antecrochet to that of the protoloph, and crochet to that of the metaloph.
 The suffix "-crista / -cristid" (upper molar / lower molar) is used for the ridges that come out of the cusps but do not connect them with other cusps. It is also used to name the edges of selenes.
 To the structures in the lingual part of the molar, the prefix "ento-" ("internal") is often added, while those of the lingual part are added the prefix "ecto-" ("external"). the mesial part of the molar is often added the prefix "pre-" (from "previous") while those of the distal part are added the prefix "post-" ("posterior"). The mesial part is that which is towards the incisors. 
 The suffix "-flexus / -flexid" (upper molar / lower molar) is used for the open valleys in the occlusal surfaces of the hypsodont teeth. When this valleys are enclosed, they are called fossetes/fossetids (upper molar / lower molar). Sometimes they are used also for the folds of the teeth, although the proper name for the folds is sulcus (pl. sulci).
 The cusp prefixes "para-", "meta-", "proto-", "hypo-", etc., are related to the succession and position of the cusps according to the ancient tritubercular theory of the evolution of molars from Cope and Osborn. Although this theory has lost its validity, they continue to use the names for the description of the molars. The prefix "proto" referred to the original cusp which would be homologous to a single cusp tooth according to Osborn, and would be the first cusp to appear not only in evolution but in development. This was criticized early by studies of embryology where it was shown that the first cusp in the embryonic development of the upper molars was the paraconus. Later this was shown to be variable and the first cusp to appear in ontogeny would not be related to the evolution of the tooth.

Image Gallery

CRICETIDAE MOLAR TEETH NOMENCLATURE AFTER REIG(1977).

Upper teeth

Lower teeth

See also 

 Molar (tooth)

References

Mammalian dental topography
Mammal anatomy
Wikipedia glossaries using tables